NA-33 Nowshera-I is a constituency for the National Assembly of Pakistan. The constituency was formerly known as NA-6 Nowshera-II from 1977 to 2018. The name changed to NA-25 (Nowshera-I) after the delimitation in 2018 and to NA-33 (Nowshera-I) after the delimitation in 2022.

Members of Parliament

1977–2002: NA-6 Nowshera-II

2002–2018: NA-6 Nowshera-II

2018-2023: NA-25 Nowshera-I

Elections since 2002

2002 general election

A total of 2,467 votes were rejected.

2008 general election

A total of 3,522 votes were rejected.

2013 general election

A total of 5,025 votes were rejected.

2018 general election 

General elections were held on 25 July 2018.

2023 By-election 
A by-election will be held on 16 March 2023 due to the resignation of Pervez Khattak, the previous MNA from this seat.

See also
NA-32 Peshawar-V
NA-34 Nowshera-II

References

External links 
 Election result's official website

25
25